Dušan Uhrin Jr. (born 11 October 1967) is a Czech football manager. He is the son of Dušan Uhrin senior who is also a football manager.

Playing career

Dušan Uhrin Jr. played in his youth at Meteor Prague and Bohemians Prague. He started his senior career at Meteor in 1984, before moving to Montáže Prag and subsequently FC Jílové. While at the latter, Uhrin suffered a severe injury and decided to concentrate on a coaching career. Between 1990 and 1991 he stepped up into the role of player/manager at RH Strašnice, but afterwards only kept on playing on occasion for FC Jílové until 1998, when he retired altogether from his playing career.

Managing career

Although Uhrin first managed RH Strašnice in 1990, his first real major team in 2000, when he co-coached Slavia Prague.

Politehnica Timișoara and return 

In the first year at Timișoara, Uhrin achieved qualification to the UEFA Cup, thereby marking the first European presence of a Timișoara team since 1992.

On 13 December 2010, Dušan was announced the new Politehnica Timişoara's Head Coach signed for one year with option to renewal for two years. After his come back he spoke for official site : "I hope the stadium will be full again! But, above all, I promise to our fans that we play good attacking football. We hope to bring out the best place possible. I want to have the same relationship with the fans from the last time, because Poli's supporters were wonderful. I'm glad that we have again the colors that he had a team since I started coaching in 2007. These are Poli's true colors!". Uhrin made an impressive re-debut by winning all of the first four matches. But after that series of victories Poli unluckily gained only one victory in the following six games. Although Poli finished second at the end of the 2010–11 Liga I season and was supposed to play in the 2011–12 UEFA Champions League, it was relegated to the Liga II because of accumulated debt and Dušan Uhrin left Poli on 27 July 2011.

Dinamo Tbilisi 
In June 2012, he signed a contract with Dinamo Tbilisi for two years. During his first year, Dinamo managed to win Georgian Championship for the first time after 2008. He resigned on 6 December 2013, and will return to the Czech Republic to manage FC Viktoria Plzeň in 2014.

Statistics

As a manager

Honours
FK Slavoj Vyšehrad
 Prague Championship: 1994–95

FK Mladá Boleslav
 Czech First League: 2005–06 (Runner-up/2nd place)
 Czech 2. Liga: 2003–04

CFR Cluj
 Cupa Romaniei: 2008–09
 Supercupa Romaniei: 2009

Politehnica Timisoara
 Liga I: 2010–11 (Runner-up/2nd place)

Viktoria Plzen
 Czech First League: 2013–14 (Runner-up/2nd place)
 Czech Cup: 2013–14 (Runner-up/2nd place)

Dinamo Minsk
 Belarusian Premier League (2): 2014, 2015 (Runner-up/2nd place)

Dinamo Tbilisi
 Umaglesi Liga: 2012–13
 Georgian Cup: 2012–13

References

External links
Profile on personal website

1967 births
Living people
Footballers from Prague
Czech footballers
Czechoslovak footballers
FK Mladá Boleslav players
Czech football managers
Czech expatriate football managers
Czech First League managers
Bohemians 1905 managers
FK Mladá Boleslav managers
FC Politehnica Timișoara managers
CFR Cluj managers
AEL Limassol managers
FC Dinamo Tbilisi managers
FC Dinamo Minsk managers
FC Viktoria Plzeň managers
SK Slavia Prague managers
FC Dinamo București managers
CS Gaz Metan Mediaș managers
Expatriate football managers in Romania
Expatriate football managers in Cyprus
Expatriate football managers in Georgia (country)
Czech expatriate sportspeople in Romania
Czech expatriate sportspeople in Cyprus
Czech expatriate sportspeople in Georgia (country)
Association football midfielders
Czech expatriate sportspeople in Belarus
Expatriate football managers in Belarus
FC Slavoj Vyšehrad managers
Karmiotissa FC managers
1. FK Příbram managers
Czech National Football League managers